Holly Jackson (born 1992) is a British author of young adult novels. She is best known for her Good Girl's Guide to Murder series.

Personal life 
Jackson grew up in Buckinghamshire, England and wrote her first novel when she was 15 years old.

Later, she attended the University of Nottingham, where she first studied literary linguistics and creative writing, graduating with a first class degree, then graduating with a master's degree in English.

Literary career 
Jackson's debut novel A Good Girl's Guide to Murder was published in 2019, where it received the following accolades:

 American Library Association's Amazing Audiobooks for Young Adults (2021)
Goodreads Choice Award Nominee for Young Adult Fiction (2020)
 Shortlisted for the YA Book Prize (2020)
 British Book Awards Children's Fiction Book Winner of the Year (2020)
Barnes and Noble Best Books of the Year (2020)

Jackson followed this up with 2 sequel novels and one prequel novella: Good Girl, Bad Blood (2020); As Good As Dead (2021); and Kill Joy (2021) respectively. Apart for Good Girl, Bad Blood, all books were published by Electric Monkey. Good Girl, Bad Blood was published by Delacorte Press, and was shortlisted for the YA Book Prize in 2021.

In 2022, Jackson released her first standalone novel called Five Survive, published in the UK by Electric Monkey and in the US by Delacorte Press.

Bibliography

A Good Girl’s Guide to Murder trilogy 

 A Good Girl’s Guide to Murder (2019)
 Good Girl, Bad Blood (2020)
As Good As Dead (2021)

Novella

Kill Joy (2021)

Standalone novels

 Five Survive (2022)

References 

1992 births
Living people
British writers
British writers of young adult literature
21st-century British women writers